Medea (minor planet designation: 212 Medea) is a very large main-belt asteroid that was discovered by Johann Palisa on February 6, 1880, in Pola, and was named after Medea, a figure in Greek mythology.

Photometric observations of this asteroid in 1987 gave an incomplete lightcurve with a period of 10.12 ± 0.06 hours and a brightness variation of 0.13 in magnitude. This object has a spectrum that matches a DCX: classification. Lightcurve data has also been recorded by observers at the Antelope Hill Observatory , which has been designated as an official observatory by the Minor Planet Center. They found a period of 10.283 hours with a brightness variation of 0.08 magnitude.

References

External links 
 Lightcurve plot of (212) Medea, Antelope Hills Observatory
 The Asteroid Orbital Elements Database
 Minor Planet Discovery Circumstances
 Asteroid Lightcurve Data File
 
 

Background asteroids
Medea
Medea
DCX:-type asteroids (Tholen)
18800206